Gastrolepta anthracina is a species of fly in the family Tachinidae.

References

Diptera of Europe
Exoristinae
Insects described in 1826
Taxa named by Johann Wilhelm Meigen